Mental Illness is the ninth studio album by singer-songwriter Aimee Mann. It was released on March 31, 2017, by SuperEgo Records. Mann described it as her "saddest, slowest and most acoustic" album. The album won the 2018 Grammy Award for Best Folk Album.

Recording

"Goose Snow Cone" was inspired by a photo of a friend's cat Mann received while on tour in Ireland. "Patient Zero" was written following a meeting Mann and her husband, Michael Penn, had with actor Andrew Garfield, who had recently arrived in Hollywood. Mann said Garfield was "obviously kind of freaked out about the vibe of being in that rarefied movie star atmosphere ... So I wrote a song inspired by that." Mann wrote "Can't You Tell" with Donald Trump in mind, who she described as "repugnant ... But I think he's miserable. He's a miserable person looking for outside solutions to internal problems, and I certainly can relate to that."

The album features contributions by Ted Leo, who collaborated with Mann on their project the Both. Jonathan Coulton co-wrote "Patient Zero", "Good For Me" and "Rollercoasters", while John Roderick of the Long Winters cowrote "Poor Judge".

The bulk of the album was recorded on Mann's label, SuperEgo Records, by producer Paul Bryan at Mayberry PCH recording studio. The string arrangements were arranged and conducted by Bryan and recorded separately at United Recordings Los Angeles by Ryan Freeland.

Mann said her manager had pressured her to create more uptempo music, but she resisted, explaining, "Because emotional honesty is uplifting, and it doesn't really matter what the emotion is. It's just uplifting, so that's how I approach it. Writing these songs is never depressing for me, and I don't think you can write out of a position of depression anyway."

Release

The first single from the album, "Goose Snow Cone", was released on January 17, 2017. On March 27, 2017, Mann performed the song on The Late Show with Stephen Colbert.

A second single from the album entitled "Patient Zero" was released on March 8, 2017. The music video features actors Bradley Whitford, Tim Heidecker and James Urbaniak.

Artwork 
The album's cover artwork is by visual artist Andrea Dezsö.

Critical reception

As opposed to her previous album, Charmer, which was defined as a "solid, punchy pop rock" album, Mental Illness consists of acoustic guitars, strings and percussion. Ryan Bray from Consequence of Sound defined it as the musical "equivalent of washing your mouth out with soap" and stated that it "smacks of cold reality".

Ryan Reed from Rolling Stone magazine described it as "sad and folky". Katie Rife from The A.V. Club pointed out that Mental Illness is a continuation of Aimee Mann's historic tradition of chronicling life's disappointments, both simple and profound. Mojo writer James McNair described it as "intimate and reflective" and said that it is "easy to get lost in". Steve Horowitz of PopMatters wrote that "Mann is our modern day Dory Previn, whose whip-smart sensibility suggests intelligence and mania at the same time." Craig Dorfman of Paste declared that "Mann has earned her reputation as a master songwriter". Jon Pareles of The New York Times stated that on Mental Illness Mann is "Tunefully Tracing Elegant Despair". Maura Johnston of The Boston Globe wrote that "Mann crafts a melancholic atmosphere that is worth repeated listens." Greg Kot of the Chicago Tribune declared it as one of Mann's "sparest, quietest albums and also among her most beautiful". Allan Raible of ABC News articulated that this record is "firmly planted in mature soundscapes", that "you may find yourself getting lost in this album's sonic textures" and that with Mental Illness "Aimee Mann continues to be one of the most gripping storytellers writing music today". Dw. Dunphy of Popdose notes that, while the music in Mental Illness is gorgeous, this isn't a "feel good" album. But, for those in the right frame of mind, it's "a warm, plush comforter to crawl into when the self-pity stops working."

Tour
Mann announced the tour, along with the album itself, on January 17, 2017. The tour encompassed performances all around North America, featuring one show in Canada, the rest taking place in the US. The first tour date was April 20, 2017, and the last two months later on June 30, 2017. Along with Mann herself, the tour featured Jonathan Coulton on acoustic guitar, Jay Bellerose on drums, a string quartet, Jamie Edwards on piano, and Paul Bryan on bass while singing backup vocals. Many of the musicians who played on the album also joined Mann on the tour (see Personnel).

Awards and nominations 
On January 28, 2018 the album won the Grammy Award for Best Folk Album. It also won Best American Roots & Folk Album at the 2018 A2IM Libera Awards.

Track listing

The Japanese edition of the album has an additional bonus track, "Throw You Over".

Personnel
Aimee Mann – lead vocals, bass, acoustic guitar, percussion
Paul Bryan – producer
Ted Leo – background vocals
Paul Bryan – bass, background vocals
Jonathan Coulton – acoustic guitar, background vocals
Jay Bellerose – drums, other percussion
Jamie Edwards – piano, harmonium, acoustic guitar, 12 string guitar

String section

Quartet 
 Eric Gorfain – Violin
 Marisa Kyney – Violin
 Leah Katz – Viola
 Richard Dodd – Cello

Violins 
Amy Wickman, Gina Kronstadt, Terry Glenny, Radu Piepta and Susan Chatman

Violas 
Aaron Oltman and Rodney Wirtz

Cello 
John Krovoza and Peggy Baldwin

Charts

References

External links
 
 
 First Listen: Aimee Mann, 'Mental Illness' on NPR
 

Aimee Mann albums
2017 albums
SuperEgo Records albums
Albums produced by Paul Bryan (musician)